Justice Edwards may refer to:

George Clifton Edwards Jr. (1914–1995), associate justice of the Michigan Supreme Court
John A. Edwards (born 1960), judge of the Irish Court of Appeal 
John Cummins Edwards (1804–1888), associate justice of the Missouri Supreme Court

See also
Judge Edwards (disambiguation)